The Times Building is one of the oldest and tallest buildings in Huntsville, Alabama, United States. The building, which is primarily used for office space, is located at the intersection of Holmes Avenue and Greene Street on the north side of Downtown Huntsville. In 1980, the building was listed on the National Register of Historic Places.

Tenants
J.F. Drake State Community and Technical College moved into the basement level of the building in January 2010 with seven classrooms (including two large computer labs) covering .

History 
Originally the building was only to have eleven floors, but a twelfth floor was added during construction when the builder of the Russel Erskine Hotel announced that it would have twelve floors. As a result of the extra floor being added during construction, the elevators do not reach the top floor.

The Huntsville Times occupied the building from the building's opening in 1928 until 1956 when it relocated to a new facility on Memorial Parkway.

From the 1970s until forced to relocate in the late 1980s, the building was home to two public radio stations, WLRH (in the basement) and the commercial radio station WAHR (which billed itself as broadcasting from "The Top of the Times").

References 

National Register of Historic Places in Huntsville, Alabama
Art Deco architecture in Alabama
Newspaper headquarters in the United States
Newspaper buildings
Office buildings completed in 1928
Office buildings on the National Register of Historic Places in Alabama